Juana Bonilla Jaime (born 16 May 1961) is a Mexican politician affiliated with the PRD. She currently serves as Deputy of the LXII Legislature of the Mexican Congress representing the State of Mexico.

References

1961 births
Living people
People from Mexico City
Women members of the Chamber of Deputies (Mexico)
Members of the Chamber of Deputies (Mexico)
Party of the Democratic Revolution politicians
21st-century Mexican politicians
21st-century Mexican women politicians
Deputies of the LXII Legislature of Mexico